The 2012 Open 13 was a men's tennis tournament played on indoor hard courts. It was the 19th edition of the Open 13, and was part of the World Tour 250 tier of the 2012 ATP World Tour. It took place at the Palais des Sports in Marseille, France, from 20 February through 26 February 2010. Fourth-seeded Juan Martín del Potro won the singles title.

Singles main draw entrants

Seeds

1 Rankings as of February 13, 2012

Other entrants 
The following players received wildcards into the main draw:
  Arnaud Clément
  Paul-Henri Mathieu
  Florent Serra

The following players received entry from the qualifying draw:
  Roberto Bautista-Agut
  Marco Chiudinelli
  David Goffin
  Albano Olivetti

Retirements
  Nikolay Davydenko (right foot injury)
  Adrian Mannarino (right wrist injury)

Doubles main draw entrants

Seeds

 Rankings are as of February 13, 2012

Other entrants
The following pairs received wildcards into the doubles main draw:
  David Guez /  Florent Serra
  Pierre-Hugues Herbert /  Nicolas Renavand

Finals

Singles

 Juan Martín del Potro defeated  Michaël Llodra, 6–4, 6–4
It was del Potro's 1st title of the year and 10th of his career.

Doubles

 Nicolas Mahut /  Édouard Roger-Vasselin defeated  Dustin Brown /  Jo-Wilfried Tsonga, 3–6, 6–4, [10–6]

References

External links
 Official website
 

Open 13
Open 13